Niebezpieczny romans is a 1930 Polish film directed by Michał Waszyński.

Cast
Bogusław Samborski ... Hieronim Spiewankiewicz 
Helena Stepowska ... Mrs. Spiewankiewiczowa 
Józef Orski ... Hieronim's Son 
Betty Amann ... Ada 
Eugeniusz Bodo ... The Burglar Chieftain 
Zula Pogorzelska ... The Maid 
Adolf Dymsza ... The Maid's Admirer 
Kazimierz Krukowski ... The Fence 
Paweł Owerłło ... The Bank Director 
Stefan Szwarc ... Jancio 
Lucjan Kraszewski ... Lucek 'Wykalaczka' 
Leon Rechenski ... Karaluch 
Kazimierz Rawicz ... Lalus 
Czesław Raniszewski ... Majsterek 
Antoni Adamczyk... Morda 
Lech Owron... Detective

External links 
 

1930 films
1930s Polish-language films
Polish black-and-white films
Films directed by Michał Waszyński
Polish romantic drama films
1930 crime drama films
Polish crime drama films
1930 romantic drama films
Transitional sound films